1994 is an Italian television series. It is the third and final installment of the Sky Atlantic TV series trilogy centered on the birth of the so-called "Second Republic", preceded by 1992 and 1993. It largely covers Silvio Berlusconi's first term in office as Prime Minister.

Cast

Main
Stefano Accorsi as Leonardo Notte
Guido Caprino as Pietro Bosco
Miriam Leone as Veronica Castello
Giovanni Ludeno as Dario Scaglia
Antonio Gerardi as Antonio Di Pietro
Paolo Pierobon as Silvio Berlusconi

See also
List of Italian television series

References

External links
 

Italian television series
Sky Atlantic (Italy) television programmes